Seth Alan McKinney (born June 12, 1979) is a former American football center. He was drafted by the Miami Dolphins in the third round of the 2002 NFL Draft. After several years with the Dolphins, McKinney also played for the Cleveland Browns and briefly for the Buffalo Bills. McKinney played college football at Texas A&M and is the younger brother of former NFL offensive lineman Steve McKinney.

Early years
Seth was born in Centerville, Texas, where his father was the town/county doctor for around 20 years.  From there they moved to Clear Lake, Texas, then to Austin, Texas.  He attended Westlake High School in Austin beginning his junior year, and was classmates with Drew Brees and Chris Mihm. He helped win the Div-II 5A State Championship in 1996, in which he was voted a team captain, and named into the 5A all-state selection twice.  He was also a state finalist in the shot put in 1996.

In 2006, he was named to the Big 12 10th Anniversary Team. In 2009, he was awarded for his success in High School Football by being selected to the UIL All-Century team.

College career
McKinney was a four-year starter at Texas A&M.  He started 50 consecutive contests (including bowl games)(2nd most at Texas A&M) during his time with the Aggies and is only the fifth center in NCAA Division I-A history to start every game in a career.  McKinney earned consensus All-Big 12 Conference honors and was an Academic All-Big 12 first-team choice, as well as a finalist for the Dave Rimington Trophy, given to the nation's top center. He was also selected a third team All-American by the Associated Press as a junior, and second team All-American by the AP as a Senior. In votes by his own teammates, he was awarded offensive lineman of the year in 2000 & 2001, offensive MVP in 2001, and team captain in 2001.  He received a BBA and MS in Management Information Systems. In 2015, McKinney was voted into the 100 top sports players at Texas A&M.

Professional career

Miami Dolphins
McKinney was a third-round draft choice (90th overall) by the Miami Dolphins in the 2002 NFL Draft. In his rookie year he played in all 16 games. He made his NFL debut at the Minnesota Vikings on December 21. In 2003, he again played in all 16 games. He started in all 16 games in 2004, for the first time in his career and the only member of the offensive line to do so. In 2005, he was part of the offensive line that allowed only 26 sacks, the fourth lowest in the league. He started in the opening 13 games but leg injury forced him out of the final three games. He did not feature at all in the 2006 season after undergoing surgery to repair a disk in his neck.

Cleveland Browns
On March 14, 2007, McKinney signed with the Cleveland Browns two weeks after his release from the Dolphins. McKinney started in 8 games in 2007 for the Cleveland Browns, before he was placed on injured reserve on November 10, 2007, ending his season. He was re-signed by the team on March 28, 2008.

Buffalo Bills
McKinney was signed by the Buffalo Bills on April 9, 2009.

In his first start of the season versus Jacksonville, Seth suffered a season ending ACL tear in his right knee.

Political career
On June 29, 2011, it was reported that McKinney intended to run for the seat in the Texas House of Representatives vacated by State Representative Fred Brown.

References

External links
Cleveland Browns bio

1979 births
Living people
People from Collin County, Texas
Clear Lake High School (Houston, Texas) alumni
American football centers
American football offensive guards
Texas A&M Aggies football players
Miami Dolphins players
Cleveland Browns players
Buffalo Bills players
People from Buffalo, Texas
People from Leon County, Texas